Lackawanna Blues is a drama television film directed by George C. Wolfe and written by Ruben Santiago-Hudson. It aired on HBO on February 12, 2005. It is based on the play of the same name by Santiago-Hudson. Wolfe had commissioned the stage version.

For her work in the movie, S. Epatha Merkerson won a Golden Globe Award, Screen Actors Guild Award, and Emmy Award in 2006.

Premise
Lackawanna Blues is the true story of Ruben Santiago Jr. growing up in Lackawanna, New York. He was raised by his father and mother and the neighborhood boarding house lady known as Rachel "Nanny" Crosby. Ruben was born in 1956 to his Puerto Rican father Ruben Santiago and his African-American mother Alean Hudson. His mother was too mentally unstable to take good care of him; residing in mental hospitals, Alean disappears and reappears throughout Ruben's life. His father stayed at Nanny's boarding house, but he was frequently not around due to working long hours or out looking for work. Nanny more or less took care of Ruben Jr. as a mother figure. The television movie depicts his life growing up there and the diverse characters that he meets during his and their stays at the boarding house.

Cast
S. Epatha Merkerson as Rachel "Nanny" Crosby 
Hill Harper as Ruben Santiago Jr. as an adult
Marcus Carl Franklin as Ruben Santiago Jr. as a boy, ages 7–10
Jimmy Smits as Ruben Santiago Sr., Ruben's father
Terrence Howard as Bill Crosby, Nanny's much younger husband
Mos Def as The Bandleader
Carmen Ejogo as Alean Hudson, Ruben's mother
Louis Gossett Jr as Ol'lem Taylor, a retired Negro league baseball player
Macy Gray as Pauline, a resident and Jimmy's girlfriend
Michael K. Williams as Jimmy, a resident and Pauline's boyfriend
Ernie Hudson as Dick Barrymore, a cabaret owner
Delroy Lindo as Mr. Lucious, a resident
Rosie Perez as Bertha, a hairdresser and resident
Adina Porter as Ricky, a resident
Jeffrey Wright as Small Paul
Ruben Santiago-Hudson as Freddie Cobbs, a World War II veteran
Saul Williams as Lonnie, a resident and war veteran
Liev Schreiber as Ulysses Ford, a social worker
Julie Benz as Laura, an abused wife
Patricia Wettig as Laura's Mother 
Ron Kellum as Fish Fry guest
Robert Bradley as Otis McClanahan (credited as "Robert A. Bradley" in some sources)

The blind Detroit street singer Robert Bradley from the band Robert Bradley's Blackwater Surprise appears in the film. He performs on-screen and has three songs featured on the soundtrack (including a duet with Macy Gray).

Awards and nominations

Notes

References

External links
 

1990s biographical drama films
Drama films based on actual events
HBO Films films
Films directed by George C. Wolfe
American biographical drama films
American films based on plays
Films set in New York (state)
Films set in the 1950s
Films set in the 1960s
Films about music and musicians
Television shows based on plays
2005 television films
2005 films
American drama television films
2000s American films